Phaeocalpida is an order of cercozoans in the class Phaeodarea.

References 

 Report on the Radiolaria. E Haeckel, 1887
 Report on the scientific results of the voyage of the HMS Challenger during the years 1873-1876. E Haeckel, Zoology series, 1887

External links 
 

 Phaeocalpida at the World Register of Marine Spacies (WoRMS)

Phaeodaria
Cercozoa orders